Dave Gorsuch (September 22, 1938 – June 26, 2021) was an American alpine skier. He competed in two events at the 1960 Winter Olympics.

References

External links
 

1938 births
2021 deaths
American male alpine skiers
Olympic alpine skiers of the United States
Alpine skiers at the 1960 Winter Olympics
People from Lake County, Colorado
20th-century American people